Shorea siamensis is a species of tree in the family Dipterocarpaceae. It is native to most of mainland Southeast Asia.

Uses 
In Cambodia, Shorea siamensis (known in Khmer as រាំងភ្នំ – Raing Phnom) is rare and most often seen near Buddhist pagodas and shrines. According to legend one of Buddha's incarnations was born under an S. siamensis tree and therefore it has a strong symbolic connection to Cambodia's Buddhist culture. The leaves of the tree are used in traditional Cambodian medicine as a tea for easing child birth.

References

siamensis
Flora of Indo-China
Flora of Malaya